In 1955, Metropolitan Cammell produced its first lightweight diesel multiple units, the prototypes of what were to become British Rail's most successful and longest-lived First Generation DMU type, the Class 101.

Operations 
The seven London Midland Region sets (formed DMBS + DTCL) were used on the Bury-Bacup line services, while the other sets (formed DMBS + DTSL) were all allocated to the Eastern Region. These sets were used on a variety of lines in East Anglia as well as the (then) non-electrified lines in Essex (Romford-Upminster and Wickford-Southminster branches).

A unit consisting of 79066 and 79282 worked the last passenger service on the Aldeburgh Branch Line in 1966.

Withdrawal
They proved to be very successful, but with line closures continuing through the 1960s, including many in East Anglia where the type was first used, their non-standard coupling arrangements left them prone to early withdrawal, which took place during 1967–1969.

Departmental use
All were scrapped following withdrawal, except two (79047 + 79053), which were taken into departmental (non-revenue earning) service as 975018 + 975019. They were used at the Railway Technical Centre in Derby as Laboratory 21: Plasma Torch Research. When this extended life was complete, they too were scrapped, in 1981.

Fleet details

References

Metro-Cammell
Metropolitan Cammell multiple units
Train-related introductions in 1955